is a Japanese baseball-themed manga series written and illustrated by Mitsuru Adachi. It was serialized in Shogakukan's Weekly Shōnen Sunday from July 1992 to November 1999, with its chapters collected in thirty-four tankōbon volumes. It was adapted into a 41-episode anime series and an 11-episode television drama series, H2: Kimi to Ita Hibi, directed by Yukihiko Tsutsumi.

As of August 2018, the H2 manga had over 55 million copies in circulation, making it one of the best-selling manga series.

Synopsis
During middle school, Hiro Kunimi (pitcher), Hideo Tachibana (third baseman and 4th batter), and Atsushi Noda (catcher) were friends and teammates on the same baseball team. Thanks to their skills, their school achieved an unbeaten record on their way to consecutive national championships.

In the seventh grade Hiro also played matchmaker to Hideo and Hikari Amamiya, a neighborhood childhood friend who grew up with him as close as a sibling. At this time Hiro, victim of a delayed growth spurt, was a very short, comparatively immature boy, uninterested in girls, and initially happy that he could get the two of them together. Eventually Hiro realized that he too had feelings for Hikari and, once he grew up, Hikari also realized that her affection for Hiro might be something more than sisterly.

As the manga begins Hiro is dealing with a doctor's diagnosis that tells him that, if he continues pitching, his elbow would shatter within three months. Likewise, Noda is diagnosed with a severe back injury by the same doctor, seemingly ending their dreams of Kōshien. Because of this, Hiro and Noda choose to go to Senkawa High School, which lacks a baseball team; Hiro instead joins the soccer team and Noda, the swim team. Their friends, Hikari and Hideo, attend Meiwa Daiichi High School, which boasts one of the top-ranked high school baseball teams in the country.

While Senkawa does not have an official baseball team they do have a baseball "fan club," voluntarily managed by the cute but klutzy Haruka Koga, a girl Hiro keeps running into- literally. While a member of the soccer team, Hiro is drawn into a practice baseball game between the soccer team and Haruka's fan club. Disgusted by the demeaning behavior of his team captain and the pompous 1st year star player, Ryūtaro Kine, (once an accomplished Little League pitcher), Hiro decides to switch sides and pitch "one last game" for the fan club. Joined by Noda, they very nearly come from behind and overcome the soccer team's large advantage in just a couple innings, but do succeed in rallying the demoralized fan club and embarrassing the soccer team.

Soon after it is revealed that the doctor who diagnosed Hiro and Noda was actually a quack and they have no lasting injuries, meaning they can return to playing baseball. Instead of transferring to Meiwa Daiichi or another school with a baseball team they decide to accept their fate and, with the help of the fan club and Haruka, persuade their "baseball-hating" headmaster to establish a proper baseball team. They succeed in this by playing Meiwa Daiichi in a practice game they were not expected to do well in. Although Senkawa ultimately loses the game by a single run (because a Meiwa Daiichi umpire lies about a call to give them the win), the game rekindles the headmaster's former love of baseball and he allows the club to be formed.

Led by novice coach Fujio Koga, Haruka's brother, the team plays their first game as an official team against the Northern Tokyo Division's leading team, Eikyo High School, in what is supposed to be a friendly practice match. Although Eikyo easily wins, the game and stories about the team reveal that the veteran coach and the famed first-year pitcher Hirota share a ruthless "win-by-any-means" game philosophy that includes purposefully injuring rival players and shunning players that do not obey them, no matter how skilled they are.

In their second year, the new baseball club gains three notable members: Sagawa, Shima, and Ohtake. Sagawa is an old friend of Hideo's who also has a reputation as a one-time delinquent, and the latter two are relatives of Hirota, planted by him to destroy Senkawa from within at his command. All eventually grow used to the friendly atmosphere of the Senkawa team and prove to be extremely valuable team members. In the final game of the divisional tournament Senkawa defeats Eikyo, advancing to the National Koshien Tournament, vindicating their style of play and specifically Coach Koga and Sagawa, who were separately both previous victims of the Eikyo coach and Hirota.

Senkawa were set to meet up with Meiwa Daiichi after two opponents in the Koshien tournament, a duel between the friends and rivals: Hiro and Hideo. This is foiled when Senkawa loses in the ninth inning of the second round when Hiro sprains his foot while dodging the opposing pitcher's hand, which was tagging first base directly under his spiked cleats. Meiwa Daiichi went on to win this Summer Tournament.

Around this time Hiro admits to Hikari that he fell in love with her in the eighth grade and still feels strongly for her. Yet at the same time he is also struggling with his feeling for Haruka and does tell her "I love you" after a situation in which he defends her from a fellow student who tried to force himself on her. Although they are much closer after this it is not certain they are officially dating.

Meiwa Daiichi fail to win their division in the Fall tournament, after the departure of their third year players,  and are not invited to the Spring invitational Koshien. This leads to Hiro and Senkawa winning the national Spring tournament without facing them.

Between the Spring and Summer tournaments a passing Hikari luckily saves the life of Hiro's mother, whom she found on the floor suffering from an acute appendicitis, but soon after loses her own mother to a sudden and unexplained illness. This devastates both Hikari and Hiro, who loved her as a second mother. Hikari is greatly comforted by a very attentive Hideo but only cries with Hiro.

Right before their last summer tournament starts Hideo tells Hikari that she must choose between him and Hiro once they face each other in what he believes is their fated showdown at Koshien. Sure enough, Senkawa and Meiwa Daiichi both advance to meet in the semi final match. Hiro only learns that Hideo made this ultimatum to her the night before the game. Hiro keeps Hideo hitless through three at bats and protects a Senkawa 2-0 lead as he faces Hideo for a final showdown with two outs in the bottom of the ninth inning.  Hideo very nearly hits a home run but it goes barely foul due to a brief gust of wind in the stadium.  On the final pitch, Hideo momentarily second-guesses which pitch Hiro is throwing and strikes out, ending the game.  As Senkawa celebrates their victory, tears fall from Hiro's eyes, but also from Hikari's eyes as she watches from the stands.

That night, Hideo talks with Hikari and admits his defeat to Hiro but she tells him that she never had the right to choose between them. Hideo then tells her that the loss made him realize that he needs Hikari more than anyone else. They embrace. The next morning, Hiro implies to Haruka that he intends to play baseball as a professional by tossing a paper airplane that he says is "traveling to the major leagues" and Haruka declares her decision to accompany him by saying "then I will be the stewardess," referencing an earlier conversation where she said she wanted to become a stewardess, which she sees as a fitting job for the wife of a baseball player.

Having resolved the real conflicts of the story, the manga ends with Senkawa traveling in their bus to play the final game of the Koshien, never revealing if they win or not.

Characters

Hiro initially escaped to Senkawa in order to forget baseball. After his elbow was properly diagnosed, he strove to strengthen the newly created Senkawa baseball team as its star pitcher. Although he's blessed with a huge amount of talent since childhood, he's also hard-working and passionate about the sport. This combination results in one of the most monstruous pitchers ever created in the world of fiction. He's a fearsome batter(the third batter of Senkawa's line-up for most of the series) and a first-class fielder. Kunimi also displays inhuman amounts of stamina and focus(during his first Koshien game in the manga, Hideo states that "He could pitch 18 innings and even then get a no-hitter"). Although he throws a great fastball(152km/h by the end of the series, possibly greater - it hit 157km/h in the drama), he has less control over his forkballs. However, since his failed forkballs turn out to be fastballs, it leads to a degree of unpredictability in his pitches. He has also developed a high-speed slider that may only be caught by a professional level catcher. Hiro was responsible for introducing Hikari to Hideo.  He has belated romantic feelings for his childhood friend, Hikari Amamiya, and starts to also develop feelings for Senkawa's manager, Koga Haruka.

Hiro's best friend and greatest rival in baseball, they were in the same baseball team in middle school. Hideo has been dating Hikari since middle school, and aims to enter the professional baseball leagues after he graduates from high school. Like Hiro, he's a natural-born genius when it comes to baseball, but that doesn't stop him from working very hard to become even better. A fantastic batter, he becomes the clean-up hitter for Meiwa Daiichi High as a first-year, quickly becoming a national star after that. There's a scene in the manga where Meiwa's coach states that "Letting Hideo face off against high-school pitchers with an aluminium bat in his hands is almost cheating". That only goes to show how skilled Hideo is as a batter.

Hiro's childhood friend and Hideo's girlfriend, Hikari dreams of becoming a journalist. She is a member of the archery club, but has once come in as a temporary manager for Meiwa Daiichi's baseball team during the Koshien by Hideo's request. Although she seems happy with Hideo, she seems to have feelings for Hiro as well.

Daughter to the businessman whom Hiro's father works for, she was a high school baseball enthusiast. A hardworking baseball club manager, she played an instrumental role in creating and supporting Senkawa's baseball club. As time goes along, her feelings for Hiro grow more apparent. She dreams of being an air flight stewardess as well as a professional baseballer's wife.

The catcher that makes up Senkawa's battery, Noda is the third person in the friendship of Hideo and Hiro. Fat and lazy, Hiro still acknowledges that Noda is a good catcher:able to make decisions about fielding and understanding the general condition of the team. Likes to joke around a lot and make bad puns, but it's actually a wise and clever person, becoming the captain of Senkawa's baseball team as a sophomore. Noda is Senkawa's clean-up hitter, and although his performance is inconsistent, he's a great batter with a good balance of strength and timing.

Used to play for the Hakusan Angels in primary school until Hideo replaced him. He turned to soccer instead, his athletic ability helping him. He tries to persuade Haruka to give up on her baseball ambitions, but later joins the baseball team in order to get closer with Haruka. Kine acts as leadoff batter and center fielder, and was also pitcher when he was in the Hakusan Angels. As a homage to Kakefu, he does left-handed baseball swings. As Haruka and Hiro's relationship gets better, he plots with Miho in order to split them up. Often used as comic relief by Adachi, he's also portrayed as a good player with a great baseball sense(and a lot of luck). Likes to brag, but also works pretty hard when motivated. Kine is also the best center fielder shown in the series.

One of the managers for Meiwa Daiichi, she joined in order to get closer to Hideo. However, she fails in this due to Hideo's loyalty to Hikari. She attempts to break them up, but continually fails. She later plots with Kine in order to break up Hideo and Hikari. Their plotting results in both Miho and Kine getting closer.

Baseball teams
Senkawa
Coached by Fujio Koga, Haruka's brother, the Senkawa team was newly created. However, the presence of Hiro, Atsushi, Yanagi and Kine soon proved that Senkawa was a threat to be considered. In Hiro's second year of high school, 3 notable players joined Senkawa: the fast Osamu, the boxer Ootake, and the shortstop Sagawa Shuuji, a friend of Hideo. In Hiro's third and last highschool year, several well acknowledged first-year players joined Senkawa, but none were focused on explicitly.
Meiwa Daiichi
Hideo and Hikari's school, Hideo is the star player. Miho is one of the managers of the team, but Hikari sat as manager during the team's Koshien games although she was just a temporary manager. The coach is understanding, and gets along well with Hideo.
Eikyo
 Eikyo's star pitcher, Hirota, is considered one of the best pitchers in the Koshien with his 142 km/h left-handed fastballs. With the backing of the calculative Coach Shiroyama, they were considered serious contenders for the Koshien. Hirota aimed to get to the pros. However, Shiroyama's calculative strategy kept their best catcher, Oogura on the bench.
Iba Shogyo
The star pitcher, Kohei Tsukigata, and the star hitter, Jin Shimizu, are both fans of Hiro and Hideo respectively. Tsukigata's pitches, and his curveball in particular, are extremely well controlled, and he had the potential to be considered a genius if he had started training early. They defeated Senkawa in the Koshien tournament as Hiro was willing to sacrifice his own leg in order to not hurt Tsukigata's hand.

Media

Manga
H2 is written and illustrated by Mitsuru Adachi. The manga ran in Shogakukan's Weekly Shōnen Sunday from July 29, 1992 to November 24, 1999. Shogakukan collected its chapters in thirty-four tankōbon volumes, released from December 12, 1992 to March 18, 2000. Shogakukan re-published the series in seventeen wide-ban volumes, released from August 6, 2004 to March 2, 2005, and twenty bunkoban volumes, released from May 15, 2009 to February 13, 2010.

Volume list

Anime
A 41-episode anime television series adaptation produced by Ashi Productions was broadcast on TV Asahi between June 1, 1995 and March 21, 1996.

Episode list

Reception 
As of August 2018, the H2 manga had over 55 million copies in circulation. On TV Asahi's Manga Sōsenkyo 2021 poll, in which 150.000 people voted for their top 100 manga series, H2 ranked 72nd.

References

External links
 
J-Drama information

1992 manga
1995 anime television series debuts
2005 Japanese television series debuts
Anime series based on manga
Asahi Broadcasting Corporation original programming
Ashi Productions
Baseball in anime and manga
Japanese drama television series
Mitsuru Adachi
Romantic comedy anime and manga
Shogakukan manga
Shōnen manga
TBS Television (Japan) dramas
TV Asahi original programming